Mangesh may refer to:

 Mangesh, a name of the god Shiva
 Mangesh, Iraq, a town in Kurdistan Region, Iraq
 Mangeshi Village, a village in Priol, Ponda, Goa, India
 Mangueshi Temple, Mangeshi Village